The 1st Cavalry Brigade was a formation of the Royal Hungarian Army that participated in the Axis invasion of Yugoslavia during World War II.

Organization 
Structure of the brigade:

 Headquarters - under Brigadier General Lajos Veress
 3rd Armoured Reconnaissance Battalion
 3rd Cavalry Regiment
 4th Cavalry Regiment
 13th Bicycle Battalion
 14th Bicycle Battalion
 3rd Motorized Artillery Battalion
 1st Horse Artillery Battalion
 1st Cavalry Artillery Battalion
 1st Cavalry Anti-Aircraft Battery
 1st Cavalry Engineer Company
 1st Cavalry Bridging Engineer Company
 1st Cavalry Signal Company
 1st Cavalry Traffic Control Signal Company
 1st Cavalry Brigade Service Regiment

Notes

References

 

Military units and formations of Hungary in World War II